Shrewsbury College is a further education college in Shrewsbury, Shropshire, England.

Shrewsbury College may also refer to:

Shrewsbury Sixth Form College, located in Shrewsbury town centre
 Shrewsbury College (fictional), in the novels of Dorothy L. Sayers, the fictional Oxford college attended by Harriet Vane